Nodirbek Primqulov, born 18  September 1998) is an Uzbek pop singer and actor.

Nodirbek started his creative activity in 2012. Nodirbek became known in 2016 with the song "Yomg’irlar".

Biography 
Nodirbek Primkulov was born on September 18, 1998 in the city of Namangan region. In 2005-2008, he studied at school No. 34 in the city of Namangan. In 2014-2017, he studied at the Namangan academic lyceum.

Career 
From 2012 to 2016, he studied wakal at the Namanganda art school. In early 2016, Primkulov released his first song "Chiroilisan" and this song brought Primkulov great fame. At the end of 2016, he released a song called "Yomgirlar". This song does not bring much luck to Primkulov either. In 2017, Primkulov presents his song called "Maryamjon" to his fans. The song "Maryamzhon" brought great fame to Primkulov. In 2018, Primkulov's song called "Ramazan" reveals many aspects. The song "Ramadan" is becoming popular not only among young people, but also among adults. At the beginning of 2019, Primkulov presented his next song called "Valley of Legends". Primkulov's fans warmly welcomed the song "Valley of Legends". By the end of 2019, he released the song "Namangon", which increases the demand for Primkulov in Namanga. In 2022, he presented a song called "Heart". In 2022, Primkulov released the songs "Onamni Kelini" and "Gozal", and this year Primkulov will release his first music album called "Kaddi Osmanim".

Single 

 «Yomg’irlar»
 «Chiroylisan»
 «Marjona»
 «Ramozon»
 «Afsonalar vodisi»
 «Qadri osmonim»
 «Namangan»
 «Xodisa»
 «Yurak»
 «Go’zal-go’zal»
 «Onamning kelini»

Discography

Studio albums

Filmography

References

External links 
Nodirbek Primqulov Spotify
Nodirbek Primqulov Instagram

Living people
1998 births
Uzbeks
21st-century Uzbekistani male singers
Uzbekistani film actors
21st-century Uzbekistani actors
People from Namangan
Folk-pop singers